The Eastern Promenade (Eastern Prom) is a historic promenade,  public park and recreation area in Portland, Maine. Construction of the Promenade began in 1836 and continued periodically until 1934. The  park was designed by the Olmsted Brothers design firm and experienced its greatest expansion from the 1880s to the 1910s. The Promenade rings around the Munjoy Hill neighborhood and occupies the farthest eastern portion of Portland's peninsula.

The promenade was regenerated by Charles R. Goodell in 1878.

Recreation
The Eastern Promenade includes a number of recreational facilities, including a paved trail  in length, the East End Beach, and sports facilities including baseball fields, basketball courts and tennis courts. The Eastern Prom Trail is popular with bicyclists. The Maine Narrow Gauge Railroad Museum is also located on the Eastern Promenade. The railway is a popular tourist attraction in the area and transported 30,000 people across the Promenade in 2009–2010. As of September 2010, the railway was considering moving due to financial concerns.

Fort Allen Park
Fort Allen Park is a  public park on the Eastern Promenade. It is the site of Fort Allen, which was active in the Revolutionary War and War of 1812; only a few earthworks remain. The park is home to an American Civil War monument in the form of a granite bench dedicated in 1929. It honors the Union Army. Portland was the only United States ship to participate in all four Pacific aircraft carrier battles of 1942: Coral Sea in May, Midway in June, Eastern Solomons in August, and Santa Cruz Islands in October. Portland was then damaged during the Naval Battle of Guadalcanal in November.

1812 Cemetery
In December 1812, following the Battle of Queenston Heights during the War of 1812, a British ship, docked under a truce flag in Portland's harbor en route from Quebec to Boston, Massachusetts, due to the presence of fever, malnutrition and dysentery among the American prisoners of war on board. 26 of the prisoners were taken to the local hospital and a month later, 21 of the prisoners had died. The dead soldiers were buried in a mass grave at the foot of Quebec Street on the Eastern Promenade, with a large boulder marking the spot of their grave. In 1887, a bronze plaque was affixed to the stone with the names of the deceased.

See also
National Register of Historic Places listings in Portland, Maine

References

Parks in Portland, Maine
Culture of Portland, Maine
History of Portland, Maine
Bike paths in Maine
Streets in Portland, Maine
Munjoy Hill
Cemeteries in Portland, Maine
Historic districts on the National Register of Historic Places in Maine
National Register of Historic Places in Portland, Maine